Babiana pygmaea is a perennial plant of about  high that annually forms leaves and flowers from an underground corm that is assigned to the iris family. It has bowl-shaped, pale yellow flowers with six perianth lobes, purplish in its heart, emerging from a cylindrical tube, and lance-shaped, pleated and heary leafblades that are almost at a right angle with the sheaths. The species can be found in the Western Cape province of South Africa. It is called geelbobbejaantjie in Afrikaans.

Description 
The stem is upright, seldomly branched and covered in velvety hairs. The blade sits at an almost right angle atop a sheath that envelops the sheaths of higher leaves.

The inner bract is slightly shorter than the outer and forked or split to approximately half length. The base colour of the star-symmetrical perianth is pale yellow with a dull purple to dark brown centre. Below the perianth tube sits an ovary that is hairy in the upper half or on the ribs. From the ovary the style emerges, which splits into three branches at the same height as the middle of the anthers. This species flowers between August and early September.

Taxonomy and naming 
Geelbobbejaantjie was first described by Nicolaas Laurens Burman in 1768 and he named it Ixia pigmaea. John Gilbert Baker in 1877 created the new combination Babiana pygmaea,  mistaking it for another species, B. nana, described earlier by Kurt Polycarp Joachim Sprengel, and he regarded Sprengel's species as a synonym of B. pygmaea. Even though the species name pygmaea was wrongly regarded as a synonym, it still is the valid name as botanical nomenclature dictates that the earliest published name has priority. Peter Goldblatt and John Charles Manning revised the genus again in 2007, and they regarded all of these names as synonymous.

The specific name pygmaea is a Latin word that means 'dwarf'. The species is however not the smallest in the genus, and it has some of the largest flowers. It is however much lower than other Ixia species, the genus that Burman the Younger originally assigned it to.

Distribution, ecology and conservation 
Geelbobbejaantjie can be found around Darling in the Western Cape province of South Africa. With its scentless, bowl-shaped pale yellow flowers and dark purplish heart, the species is typically adapted to pollination by monkey beetles. Small subpopulations remain on four to six locations after most renosterveld in the Swartland area has been reclaimed for agriculture. Even there, the species remains under pressure due to competition by unchecked invasive plants such as Acacia, and local heavy grazing. The total population in 2015 was estimated at less than 1500 specimen and is expected to further decline. Therefore, geelbobbejaantjie is considered to be critically endangered.

References 

pygmaea
Endemic flora of South Africa
Plants described in 1768
Taxa named by Nicolaas Laurens Burman